The Mintaka Pass or Mingteke Pass or Mintika Pass() is a mountain pass in the Karakorum Mountains, between Pakistan and Xinjiang in China. In ancient times, the Mintaka Pass and the nearby Kilik Pass,  to the west, were the two main access points into Gojal (the upper Hunza Valley) from the north.  The Hunza Valley is a mountainous valley near Gilgit in Gilgit-Baltistan, Pakistan. In addition, the two passes were also the routes used to reach Chalachigu Valley and Taghdumbash Pamir from the south. The name of the pass – Mintaka means "a thousand ibex" in Kyrgyz.

History
During ancient times, Mintaka Pass and Kilik Pass were the shortest and quickest ways into Northern India from the Tarim Basin and were usually open all year, but extremely dangerous and only suited for travellers on foot.

Laden animals could be taken over the Mintaka and Kilik passes into upper Hunza (both open all year), but then loads would have to be carried by coolie (porters) to Gilgit (an expensive and dangerous operation). From there, cargoes could be reloaded onto pack animals again and taken either east to Kashmir and then on to Taxila (a long route), or west to Chitral which provided relatively easy access to either Jalalabad, or Peshawar via Swat.

The "Sacred Rock of Hunza" has numerous petroglyphs depicting mounted horseman and ibex along with Kharoshthi inscriptions that mention Saka and Pahlava rulers. Historians assess that Maues must have used the Karakorum route via Mintaka or Kilik passes to capture Taxila in the first century BCE.

Mintaka Pass was the main route used until the recent advance of glaciers. After the glaciation of Mintaka Pass,  Kilik Pass has been favoured by caravans coming from China and Afghanistan as it is wider, free of glaciers and has enough pasture for caravan animals.

Current status 
In 1966, when the Karakoram Highway connecting Pakistan and China was being constructed, Pakistan initially favored routing through Mintaka Pass. However, China, citing the fact that Mintaka was more susceptible to air strikes, recommended the steeper and higher Khunjerab Pass instead. Eventually, the new Karakoram Highway was built through the Khunjerab Pass.

As of late 2010s, on the Pakistani side, there are some trekking companies that offer tours to Mintaka Pass. On the Chinese side, the entire valley around Mintaka Pass is closed to visitors; however, local residents and herders from the area are permitted to access.

See also
 China–Pakistan border
 Beyik Pass 
 Tegermansu Pass 
 Wakhjir Pass 
 Kilik Pass 
 Chalachigu Valley 
 Afghanistan–China_border 
 China–Tajikistan border

Footnotes

Mountain passes of the Karakoram
Mountain passes of Gilgit-Baltistan
China–Pakistan border crossings
Mountain passes of Xinjiang
Mountain passes of China